Porphyry Island is an island in Unorganized Thunder Bay District in northwestern Ontario, Canada. It is the last island in a chain stretching south west of the Black Bay Peninsula in Lake Superior.

The island and nature reserve take their name from the characteristic quartz and feldspar crystals, or porphyries found in the volcanic rocks.

The entire  island constitutes the Porphyry Island Provincial Park or nature reserve.

Point Porphyry Lighthouse
The federal government established a lighthouse at Point Porphyry in 1873. This is located at the southwestern tip of the island.

References

Sources

Landforms of Thunder Bay District
Uninhabited islands of Ontario
Islands of Lake Superior in Ontario